Europium dichloride is an inorganic compound with a chemical formula EuCl2. When it is irradiated by ultraviolet light, it has bright blue fluorescence.

Production
Europium dichloride can be produced by reducing europium trichloride with hydrogen gas at high temperature
 2 EuCl3 + H2 → 2 EuCl2 + 2 HCl

If dry europium trichloride reacts with lithium borohydride in THF, it can also produce europium dichloride：
 2 EuCl3 + 2 LiBH4 → 2 EuCl2 + 2 LiCl + H2↑ + B2H6↑

Properties
Europium dichloride can form yellow ammonia complexes:EuCl2•8NH3, and can dissolve to pale yellowish EuCl2•NH3. Europium dichloride can react with europium hydride at 120-bar H2, producing EuClH that fluoresces green.

References

Europium(II) compounds
Chlorides
Lanthanide halides